Víctor Rodríguez Soria (born 7 September 1987) is an Andorran international footballer who plays as a defender for UE Engordany. Rodríguez made his international debut in 2008.

Career
On 6 September 2015, in a 3–0 away loss to Bosnia and Herzegovina in UEFA Euro 2016 qualifying, Muhamed Bešić threw his chewing gum at Rodríguez, who retaliated; both were given straight red cards.

References

External links

Víctor Rodríguez at La Preferente

1987 births
Living people
Andorran footballers
Andorra international footballers
Association football defenders
FC Santa Coloma players
UE Santa Coloma players
UE Engordany players
Primera Divisió players